Oylegate or Oilgate, also known previously as   Mullinagore, is a small village in Ireland, located about halfway between Wexford and Enniscorthy towns, in County Wexford. It had a population of 358 as of the 2016 census.

Name

The name is usually officially spelled as Oilgate and this spelling can be found on road signs entering the village and is the common spelling used on maps and by the Central Statistics Office. However, the spelling Oylegate is found on a plaque on the wall of the village national school dated 1929, and most locals spell it as such.

The Irish name for Oylegate is Bearna na hAille, bearna meaning gap or gate and aill meaning cliff, getting its name from the place that the river Slaney breaks through the gap in the cliffs or rocks on its way to Wexford harbour.  It would appear that the name Oylegate became anglicised over time and got its name by saying aill quickly (oila) and gate from the English translation of bearna, gap or gate.

Oylegate is also referred to as Maolán na nGabhar which is the Irish name for Mullinagore, getting its name from the area of land where goats used to graze.  This reference is likely because there is no actual townland recorded as Oylegate and the townland of Mullinagore would have been the more central part of the village consisting of the local church, the old school and a small settlement of houses.  The Electoral District (E.D) of Edermine covers all of Oylegate, parts of Glenbrien with Ballyhuskard covering all the remaining townlands (except for Ballycourcy more which is in the E.D of Enniscorthy Rural).

Community and amenities
The village's patron saint is Saint David, after whom the local Roman Catholic church is named. It has an adjoining cemetery. There is a blessed well and shrine named Saint David's in nearby Ballinaslaney. A village approximately 5 kilometres northeast called Glenbrien is the half parish of Oylegate.

The village has a National school, two public houses (Mernagh's and The Slaney Inn), a combined post office/shop, a petrol station, a police (Garda) station and a small retail park, including a flooring and tile store.

Sport
Gaelic games (hurling, camogie, Gaelic football) are played in the local Gaelic Athletic Association complex, home to the Oylegate-Glenbrien teams. Hurler and club member Pat Nolan played for Wexford as goalkeeper for many years throughout the 1950s, 60s and 70s and is regarded as one of the best and most fearless to ever play in that position. He won two All-Ireland medals on the field of play in 1960 (alongside his brother, John) and 1968 and as a substitute in 1956. He helped the Oylegate-Glenbrien club win their sole Wexford Club Hurling Championship title in 1963.

See also
 List of towns and villages in Ireland

References

External links
Book Oylegate Glenbrien A Look Back in Time
Oylegate-Glenbrien GAA Club on GaelicGames.in

Towns and villages in County Wexford